The 2017 Cary Challenger was a professional tennis tournament played on hard courts. It was the 3rd edition of the tournament which was part of the 2017 ATP Challenger Tour. It took place in Cary, North Carolina, United States between 11 and 17 September 2017.

Singles main-draw entrants

Seeds

 1 Rankings are as of August 28, 2017.

Other entrants
The following players received wildcards into the singles main draw:
  William Blumberg
  Alexis Galarneau
  Thai-Son Kwiatkowski
  Patrick Kypson

The following players received entry into the singles main draw using protected rankings:
  Kevin King
  Alexander Ward

The following players received entry from the qualifying draw:
  Ryan Haviland
  Skander Mansouri
  Aleksandar Vukic
  Julian Zlobinsky

The following player received entry as a lucky loser:
  Luke Bambridge

Champions

Singles

 Kevin King def.  Cameron Norrie 6–4, 6–1.

Doubles

 Marcelo Arévalo /  Miguel Ángel Reyes-Varela def.  Miķelis Lībietis /  Dennis Novikov 6–7(6–8), 7–6(7–1), [10–6].

References

Cary Challenger
Cary Challenger